In linear algebra and projective geometry, Gerbaldi's theorem, proved by , states that one can find six pairwise apolar linearly independent nondegenerate ternary quadratic forms.  These are permuted by the Valentiner group.

References

Quadratic forms
Theorems in linear algebra
Theorems in projective geometry